Bozlar can refer to:

 Bozlar, Biga
 Bozlar, Burdur